Sukanta Mahavidyalaya, established in 1981, is general degree college in Dhupguri. It offers undergraduate courses in arts and sciences. It is affiliated to  University of North Bengal.

Departments

Science

Chemistry
Physics 
Mathematics
Computer Science 
Botany
Zoology

Arts

Bengali
English
Sanskrit
History
Geography
Political Science
Philosophy
Economics
Education
Sociology
Physical Education

Accreditation
The college is recognized by the University Grants Commission (UGC).

See also

References

External links
Sukanta Mahavidyalaya
University of North Bengal
University Grants Commission
National Assessment and Accreditation Council

Colleges affiliated to University of North Bengal
Educational institutions established in 1981
Universities and colleges in Jalpaiguri district
1981 establishments in West Bengal
Jalpaiguri district